Floorball at the 2019 Southeast Asian Games was held at the University of the Philippines College of Human Kinetics Gymnasium in Quezon City, Metro Manila, Philippines from 25 November to 1 December 2019. Medals were awarded for both men and women competitions.

Participating nations
A total of 190 athletes from 5 nations were participating (the numbers of athletes are shown in parentheses).

Competition schedule
The following is the competition schedule for the floorball competitions:

Medal summary

Medal table

Medalists

Men's competition

The tournament featured 5 countries. The format was the same as 2015; there was a group of five with round-robin format. The top two of group played for the gold medal and the third and fourth place of group played for the bronze medal.

Women's competition

The tournament featured 5 countries. The format was the same as 2015; there was a group of five with round-robin format. The top two of group played for the gold medal and the third and fourth place of group played for the bronze medal.

References

External links